San José de Balcarce (shortened to Balcarce) is a city in Buenos Aires Province (Argentina) about  west of Mar del Plata with a population of approx 44,064 (2010 census). It is the cabecera (head town) of the Balcarce Partido (District of Balcarce). The UN/LOCODE is ARBCA.

The city is famous as the birthplace of Formula One legend Juan Manuel Fangio and today houses the Museo Juan Manuel Fangio ("Juan Manuel Fangio" Museum) and the Autódromo Juan Manuel Fangio, a motorsports circuit.

The town hall, cemetery portal and slaughterhouse were all designed by the architect, Francisco Salamone, and contain elements of Art Deco style. Built in the late 1930s, these buildings were some of the first examples of modern architecture in rural Argentina.

Museo del Automovilismo "Juan Manuel Fangio" 
Located just a few blocks from where Fangio was born, the museum houses a collection of cars, trophies, photographs and other memorabilia.

Climate

References

External links
 Balcarce local government Official site
 Museo del Automovilismo "Juan Manuel Fangio" Official site

Populated places in Buenos Aires Province
Populated places established in 1874
Cities in Argentina
1874 establishments in Argentina
Argentina